Leonard Kipkemoi Bett (born 3 November 2000) is a Kenyan track and field athlete who specializes in 3000 metres steeplechase and cross country running. Representing Kenya at the 2019 World Athletics Championships, he qualified for the final in men's 3000 metres steeplechase.

He competed at the 2019 IAAF World Cross Country Championships, where he placed fourth in the junior class.

He qualified to represent Kenya at the 2020 Summer Olympics, where he failed to make into the final finishing fifth in his heat.

References

External links

Kenyan male steeplechase runners
Kenyan male cross country runners
2000 births
Living people
World Athletics Championships athletes for Kenya
World Youth Championships in Athletics winners
Athletes (track and field) at the 2020 Summer Olympics
Olympic athletes of Kenya